Mendive is a surname of Basque origin.

People with the name
 Manuel Mendive (born 1944), Afro-Cuban artist
 María Mendive (born 1968), Uruguayan actress and theater director
 Ron Mendive, Idaho politician

See also
 Mendive, a commune in the Pyrénées-Atlantiques department, France

References

Basque-language surnames